The Washington Principles on Nazi-Confiscated Art, formally the Washington Conference Principles on Nazi-Confiscated Art and sometimes referred to as the Washington Declaration is a statement concerning the restitution of art confiscated by the Nazi regime in Germany before and during World War II. It was released in connection with the Washington Conference on Holocaust Era Assets, held in Washington, D.C., United States, on 3 December 1998.

The Conference 

The conference was hosted by the United States Department of State and the United States Holocaust Memorial Museum. It assembled participants from a 1995 New York symposium, The Spoils of War—World War II and Its Aftermath: The Loss, Reappearance, and Recovery of Cultural Property, along with others, and built on the Nazi Gold conference which had been held in London in December 1997.

The conference was held from November 30 to December 3, 1998 and was attended by representatives of 44 countries and 13 nongovernmental organizations, art museums and auction houses.

The 1998 conference's aim was to discuss Jewish losses in particular, including artworks, books, and archives, as well as insurance claims and other types of assets. 44 governments, including Germany, sent delegates, as did thirteen international non-governmental organizations. The conference organizer was the U.S. Under Secretary of State for Economic, Business, and Agricultural Affairs, Stuart E. Eizenstat, who had previously been United States Ambassador to the European Union, and its chairman was Judge Abner Mikva. U.S. Secretary of State, Madeleine Albright gave the opening address.

The Principles 

The statement includes eleven numbered principles, prefixed:

The principles are:

 Art that had been confiscated by the Nazis and not subsequently restituted should be identified.
 Relevant records and archives should be open and accessible to researchers, in accordance with the guidelines of the International Council on Archives.
 Resources and personnel should be made available to facilitate the identification of all art that had been confiscated by the Nazis and not subsequently restituted.
 In establishing that a work of art had been confiscated by the Nazis and not subsequently restituted, consideration should be given to unavoidable gaps or ambiguities in the provenance in light of the passage of time and the circumstances of the Holocaust era.
 Every effort should be made to publicize art that is found to have been confiscated by the Nazis and not subsequently restituted in order to locate its pre-War owners or their heirs.
 Efforts should be made to establish a central registry of such information.
 Pre-War owners and their heirs should be encouraged to come forward and make known their claims to art that was confiscated by the Nazis and not subsequently restituted.
 If the pre-War owners of art that is found to have been confiscated by the Nazis and not subsequently restituted, or their heirs, can be identified, steps should be taken expeditiously to achieve a just and fair solution, recognizing this may vary according to the facts and circumstances surrounding a specific case.
 If the pre-War owners of art that is found to have been confiscated by the Nazis, or their heirs, can not be identified, steps should be taken expeditiously to achieve a just and fair solution.
 Commissions or other bodies established to identify art that was confiscated by the Nazis and to assist in addressing ownership issues should have a balanced membership.
 Nations are encouraged to develop national processes to implement these principles, particularly as they relate to alternative dispute resolution mechanisms for resolving ownership issues.

The Principles were outlined by Eizenstat, along with "Declarations of the Task Force for International Cooperation on Holocaust Education, Remembrance, and Research." He also gave a statement at the conference, titled In Support of Principles on Nazi-Confiscated Art, saying:

References

External links 
 The Statement

1998 in the arts
Aftermath of the Holocaust